Bruce Such (1907 – 14 April 1933) was an Australian cricketer. He played in two first-class matches for Queensland between 1931 and 1933.

See also
 List of Queensland first-class cricketers

References

External links
 

1907 births
1933 deaths
Australian cricketers
Queensland cricketers
Cricketers from Sydney